Piezocerini is a tribe of beetles in the subfamily Cerambycinae, containing the following genera:

 Acruspex
 Alienosternus
 Cicatrizocera
 Colynthaea
 Gorybia
 Haruspex
 Hemilissa
 Migmocera
 Migorybia
 Othnocerus
 Pharcidodes
 Piezarina
 Piezasteria
 Piezocera
 Piezogenista
 Piezosecus
 Pseudocolynthaea
 Thyellocerus
 Zelliboria

References

 
Cerambycinae